Mover or movers may refer to:
 Motion (parliamentary procedure), in parliamentary procedure, the person who introduces a motion
 Moving company, a service which helps with packing, moving and storage
 People mover, a type of mass-transit
 Prime mover (disambiguation)
 Unmoved mover, a philosophical concept of that which moves all but is unmoved by everything else

Persons with the surname
 Bob Mover (born 1952), American saxophonist
 Emilie Mover, Canadian singer-songwriter
 Jonathan Mover, American drummer
 Franz Karl Movers (1806–1856), German theologian

See also
 The Mover, 2018 drama film
 Motion (physics), the concept of a change in position of an object with respect to time
 Move (disambiguation)
 Moves (disambiguation)
 Moving (disambiguation)